Jim Reardon is an American animator, storyboard artist, television writer, television director, and screenwriter. He is best known for his work on the animated TV series The Simpsons. He has directed over 30 episodes of the series and was credited as a supervising director for seasons 9 through 15. Reardon attended the Character Animation program at the California Institute of the Arts in 1982, where one of his student projects, the satirical cartoon Bring Me the Head of Charlie Brown (1986), has become a cult classic through the likes of YouTube. He was hired by John Kricfalusi as a writer on Mighty Mouse: The New Adventures and later worked on Tiny Toon Adventures. He has been described by Ralph Bakshi as "one of the best cartoon writers in the business".

Reardon supervised the storyboard department and co-wrote the Pixar film WALL-E with Andrew Stanton, which was released on June 27, 2008. He was nominated for an Academy Award for Best Original Screenplay for WALL-E at the 81st Academy Awards.

List of The Simpsons episodes
"Itchy & Scratchy & Marge"
"Bart's Dog Gets an "F"
"Brush with Greatness"
"When Flanders Failed"
"Treehouse of Horror II"
"Saturdays of Thunder"
"Homer at the Bat"
"Dog of Death"
"Bart's Friend Falls in Love"
"Homer the Heretic"
"Mr. Plow"
"Duffless"
"Marge in Chains"
"Homer Goes to College"
"Homer the Vigilante"
"Bart Gets an Elephant"
"Bart of Darkness"
"Treehouse of Horror V"
"Homer the Great"
"Lisa's Wedding"
"Lemon of Troy"
"King-Size Homer"
"Bart the Fink"
"22 Short Films About Springfield"
"Burns, Baby Burns"
"El Viaje Misterioso de Nuestro Jomer (The Mysterious Voyage of Homer)"
"My Sister, My Sitter"
"Homer's Enemy"
"The City of New York vs. Homer Simpson"
"Trash of the Titans"
"Thirty Minutes over Tokyo"
"Alone Again, Natura-Diddily"
"Treehouse of Horror XII"
"Large Marge"
"Simple Simpson"

Filmography
Bring Me the Head of Charlie Brown (1986) – director
Mighty Mouse: The New Adventures (1987–88) – writer, storyboard artist, director
Christmas in Tattertown (1988) – writer, layout artist
The Butter Battle Book (1989) - storyboard artist
Tiny Toon Adventures (1990) – writer
The Simpsons (1990–2004) – director, supervising director, storyboard consultant
WALL-E (2008) – screenwriter, story supervisor
Wreck-It Ralph (2012) – writer, head of storyInside Out (2015) – storyboard artistZootopia (2016) – writer, co-head of story
Ralph Breaks the Internet (2018) – characters, writer, director of story

References

External links
 
 Video of Bring Me the Head of Charlie Brown

American animated film directors
American animators
American storyboard artists
American television directors
Animation screenwriters
American parodists
Comedy film directors
Parody film directors
Annie Award winners
California Institute of the Arts alumni
Hugo Award-winning writers
Living people
Nebula Award winners
Pixar people
Primetime Emmy Award winners
Walt Disney Animation Studios people
Year of birth missing (living people)